The New Statesman is a British sitcom made in the late 1980s and early 1990s satirising the United Kingdom's Conservative government of the period. It was written by Laurence Marks and Maurice Gran at the request of, and as a starring vehicle for, its principal actor Rik Mayall.

The show's theme song is an arrangement by Alan Hawkshaw of part of the Promenade from Pictures at an Exhibition by Russian composer Modest Mussorgsky.

The programme was made by the ITV franchise Yorkshire Television between 1987 and 1992, although the BBC made two special episodes; one in 1988, the other in 1994.

Cast list
Rik Mayall as Alan B'Stard MP
Michael Troughton as Piers Fletcher-Dervish MP
Marsha Fitzalan as Sarah B'Stard
Rowena Cooper as Norman/Norma Bormann (Series 1; she was credited as "R. R. Cooper" in all but episode six, in order to keep her gender uncertain)
Charles Gray as Roland Gidleigh-Park (Series 1)
Vivien Heilbron as Beatrice Protheroe (Series 1)
Steve Nallon as Mrs Thatcher (Series 1–2)
John Nettleton as Sir Stephen Baxter (Series 1–2)
Nick Stringer as Bob Crippen (Series 1–2)
Berwick Kaler as Geoff Diquead (Series 2)
Terence Alexander as Sir Greville McDonald (Series 2–4)
Brigitte Kahn as Frau Kleist MEP, who shares Alan's office for most of Series 4.
Peter Sallis as Sidney Bliss, (played by John Normington in the special Who Shot...) a former hangman and current publican in Alan's constituency
John Woodvine as Sir Malachi Jellicoe (Series 1)
Benjamin Whitrow as Paddy O'Rourke

Characters

Alan Beresford B'Stard MP
B'Stard was a selfish, greedy, dishonest, lecherous, ultra-right-wing Conservative backbencher who occasionally resorted to murder to fulfil his ambitions. The show was mostly set in B'Stard's antechambers in the Palace of Westminster and featured Piers Fletcher-Dervish, B'Stard's gullible upper-class sidekick. B'Stard shares a middle name with Norman Tebbit.

B'Stard was MP for the then-fictional constituency of Haltemprice (in 1997, re-drawn boundaries led to the constituency of Boothferry in East Yorkshire being renamed "Haltemprice and Howden"). Goldsborough Hall was used to portray his Yorkshire country residence and was used as a backdrop for the opening photo sequences along with some exterior shots in the first series, including the scene where he tries to run over the gardener in his Bentley. The town of Knaresborough, North Yorkshire was used to film the opening election sequence in the first episode and roads around Goldsborough were used to shoot the police car chase from the first series where the policeman's gun backfires. Some city scenes were not filmed in London, but Leeds, with Leeds Town Hall used as the High Court.

Alan was the youngest MP at the age of 31, and was a distillation of the greed and callousness that were considered the hallmarks of new money Thatcherites. B'Stard was married to Sarah, a vain, devious nymphomaniac who wanted nothing more than for Alan to die so she could become a rich widow. The couple cheated on each other in perpetuity but remained in a marriage of convenience; Sarah because of Alan's money and Alan because Sarah's father controlled the local Tory Party and held Alan's seat in his gift.

Alan's schemes grew wilder and more bold as the series progressed taking in bribery, murder and provoking trade union disputes to make a profit. Later, B'Stard would intentionally mismanage the Tory election campaign so Labour would be blamed for an economic crisis, stage his own assassination to bring back hanging (and make £1 million in the process). In the last episode he creates splits in both the Tory and Labour parties and names himself Lord Protector.

Whatever crises and scandals swirled around the evil B'Stard, he would always come up smelling of roses. When accused of engaging in sex acts with minors, Alan successfully sued The Times newspaper; when he plotted to get his hands on the stolen millions of Robert Maxwell who was hiding in Bosnia he was hailed as a humanitarian hero. Even when Alan was sentenced to death he managed to escape the noose and retain his position in Parliament. B'Stard's greatest triumph came when he managed to get himself released from incarceration in a Siberian gulag following his assassination attempt on Soviet president Mikhail Gorbachev and returned to the UK a hero. Having lost his Westminster seat during his forced absence in Russia, Alan manages to procure himself a German seat in the European Union's parliament as well as getting Piers onto the European Commission, with the two of them proceeding to cause more havoc on the continent and further enhance Alan's reputation back home.

B'Stard would habitually use others to aid his quest for money and power. Sidney Bliss, the local pub landlord (and a former hangman), was completely in his power in the hope of regaining his position. Many others – old Nazis, Cabinet ministers and even Salman Rushdie – would regularly pay to buy his silence.

A running joke throughout the series was that, despite his extreme good looks and how easy it was for him to pursue his constant womanising, B'Stard was very under-endowed and suffered from premature ejaculation. A good quantity of women he bedded would be disappointed or contemptuous of his abilities in bed, despite his delusion that they must have enjoyed his sexual company as much as he did theirs. In fact, he thinks it a sign of virility that he's able to be so quick in bed.

In the stage show it was revealed that Alan had been the architect of New Labour when he realised the Tories were done for (effectively ignoring the last episode of the series), picking a young guitar-playing hippie named Tony Blair and grooming him to be PM. B'Stard transformed Labour into a second Conservative Party, eradicating socialism and effectively running the country from his palatial office at Number 9 Downing Street. The show saw an older Alan, fabulously rich after orchestrating Black Wednesday, still up to his old tricks playing America and Al-Qaeda off each other in the hunt for weapons of mass destruction. By now, Alan is onto his fourth wife (Arrabella Lucretia B'Stard), although the show's first run saw Sarah still firmly in place.

Until May 2007 'Alan' wrote a weekly opinion column in the Sunday Telegraph where he would detail his involvement in current events and even contributed to a Telegraph special of the Blair years where he hinted at being behind the deaths of John Smith, Mo Mowlam and Robin Cook. In the stage show, Alan's involvement in the death of David Kelly was also hinted at.

The newspaper column was written to suggest that the stage show was written by B'Stard himself to communicate his triumphs to the ordinaries. After Gordon Brown was named as Blair's successor, B'Stard's final column implied that, bored with the UK and unable to tolerate a Brown premiership, Alan would quit the country to take up a new position as Head of the World Bank, leaving the door open to a potential return. Other columns had implied that Alan had already begun to groom David Cameron, in preparation for the end of New Labour's era and an electoral return for the Conservatives.

Rik Mayall's death on 9 June 2014 prompted Laurence Marks and Maurice Gran to also kill B'Stard by writing an obituary for him (with B'Stard's date of death the same as Mayall's). It is explained that Alan died while making love to his two faithful Polynesian masseurs and states that B'Stard went on to marry Lady Gaga, his fifth wife and left behind five children and twelve grandchildren. It is also revealed that B'Stard's birth date is 29 February.

The Hon. Sir Piers Fletcher-Dervish, Baronet MP
Alan's bumbling fellow MP who helps out with his schemes, which at times Piers complicates or outright foils with his naivety. Alan frequently bullies Piers into following his commands and exploits his childlike personality for his own gain. Piers remains loyal to Alan despite the abuse the latter subjects him to. Any attempts at refusing or rebelling against him tend to end painfully. Instances of abuse include Alan tying Piers' beloved childhood teddy bear to a chair and setting it on fire during a psychotic episode after Piers was promoted to junior ministerial position, and Alan threatening to kill Piers's new-born son Jarvis to force him into vacating his seat in order to get Sir Greville back into parliament.

Sarah B'Stard
Alan's materialistic wife who almost equals her husband in his capacity for cruelty and sexual deviancy. Despite coming from a wealthy background herself, she married Alan for his money and to further her social status, being far more invested in her hedonistic desires than his welfare, which she willingly compromises numerous times throughout the series.

Sir Greville McDonald
Sir Greville was introduced in the final episode of series 2, portrayed as a corrupt cabinet minister who recruited an unwitting Piers as junior Minister for Housing in order to 'nod through' some of his shadier housing projects. Sir Greville had his first dealings with B'Stard in this episode who implied he would expose him unless he agreed a similar arrangement for B'Stard, and thus became a suspect for the audience in Alan's shooting at the episode's climax. By the time of Alan's 'miraculous recovery', Sir Greville had been promoted by Thatcher to Minister for Law and Order and negotiated with Alan for the return of the gallows (earning himself a finder's fee of £50,000). Sir Greville found it particularly amusing when B'Stard was sentenced to death and in fact spent the night of Alan's planned execution with the condemned man's wife.

Greville can be viewed as an older and more restrained version of B'Stard. Just as quick to make shady money and with somewhat sordid personal tastes but with a stronger respect for parliamentary institutions and the Conservative Party itself. Greville in fact places the good of the Tory Party far above the good of the country and says as much in the last episode.

By series 3, Greville is Secretary of State for the Environment and has developed a love-hate relationship with B'Stard which eventually evolves into a mutual respect. Series 4 found Greville out of Parliament after the 1992 election when local voters disagreed with his decision to place a nuclear waste plant in the middle of his own constituency. After some persuasion from B'Stard, Greville takes over Piers' seat and becomes Secretary of State for European Affairs, thus ensuring a wealth of opportunities to connive with Alan in Europe. The last episode saw Greville split with Alan and become part of The Progressive Federalists who were soundly thrashed by Alan's New Patriotic Party at the polls.

Sir Stephen Baxter
An elderly backbench Conservative MP who shared the office with Alan and Piers during the first two series. Sir Stephen's morally uptight old-school attitude and respect for parliamentary protocol meant that he contrasted sharply with the self-centred Alan and the clueless Piers, serving as further comic foil to bounce the two of them off. Despite being in parliament for a very long time he has been consigned to the back benches for many years after taking the fall in a scandal involving another minister who would go on to become Secretary of State for Wales. Alan has little respect for him and is more than willing to exploit Sir Stephen's helpful and professional nature for his own ends, including plagiarising one of Sir Stephen's speeches in the Commons in order to ensure that Alan's Private Member's Bill on arming the police would pass into law. He is last seen in Series 2 when, having already been alienated by the introduction of TV cameras and film crews into the House of Commons, Sir Stephen witnesses Piers inflating a blow-up Alan B'Stard doll in a suggestive manner. Sir Stephen gives Piers a stern telling-off before declaring that he "might as well accept that peerage" and then leaves the office, suggesting that he moved up to the House of Lords.

Roland Gidleigh-Park
Roland is Sarah's xenophobic father and leader of the local Conservatives. His power means that B'Stard must maintain his favour to keep his seat.

Norman/Norma Bormann
Norman is Alan's accountant and personal confidante. After being forced into hiding by being pursued by the authorities, Norman handles this problem through undergoing a sex-change, and throughout the first series the effects of this happen rapidly.

Sidney Bliss
Sidney is an elderly, neurotic publican in Alan's Yorkshire constituency, doubling as an infrequent assistant. As a former hangman with an obsessive love for the method of execution, he asks Alan for the chance to get his old career back.

In the special Who Shot..., he managed to regain his old position when the death penalty was re-introduced. After Alan's unsuccessful and half-hearted lobbying of Sir Greville McDonald for Sidney's reinstatement as a hangman, Sidney blackmailed Sir Greville into reinstating him, threatening to tell the newspapers that he carried out the secret execution of Lord Lucan in 1974, ten years after the abolition of the death penalty in 1964. Sidney likely lost his position as hangman, as well as his chance to 'tour' South Africa and South America, after Alan survived his execution due to the gallows' construction from balsa wood.

Bob Crippen
Bob Crippen is the self-righteous but short-tempered Labour MP who represents the deprived inner city constituency of Bramall, and, like B'Stard, has a large majority. Crippen is B'Stard's first established rival in the series. His political career followed time spent working in the car manufacturing industry and as a trade union representative.

Filming 
Goldsborough Hall was used to portray B'Stard's Yorkshire residence and was used as a backdrop for the opening photo sequences along with some exterior shots in the first series. The town of Knaresborough, North Yorkshire was used to film the opening election sequence in the first episode and roads around Goldsborough were used to shoot the police car chase from the first series. Some city scenes were not filmed in London, but Leeds, with Leeds Town Hall used as the High Court.
Bramham Park was used as Piers' fiancé Clarissa's family home in the series 2 episode "May The Best Man Win".

Political ideals

Over the course of the series, stage shows and newspaper columns, Alan opined on numerous topics, most of which demonstrated his contempt for the working class and indeed anyone not of the political and financial elite (the ordinaries). During an argument with a constituent, B'Stard declared that he believed he was helping British industry by driving a Bentley (a Lagonda In series 4) and having his suits handmade by British craftsmen. B'Stard's arrogance even extended to claiming that there was nothing wrong with the education system that could not be put right with £2,500 a term, and that National Health Service (NHS) waiting lists could be abolished by shutting down the health service, thereby eradicating poor people and eliminating poverty. B'Stard continued this train of thought through his defection to New Labour when he was instrumental in arranging a postcode lottery for cancer treatment so that "only the right people get better".

Alan at one time proposed inverting the rallying cry of the American War of Independence by stating that "No representation without taxation" was a more fitting clarion call, believing people such as himself (the "enterprising, over-taxed minority") to be called on far too often to bail out other members of society. Alan used the same argument when proposing to cut off all social security payments to elderly people as he believes they should have considered how they would look after themselves instead of wasting their money on "ghastly holidays in Blackpool". When being interviewed by Brian Walden, Alan readily conceded that should he rule the UK, the rich would only pay tax on their cocaine, children would be forced to work in mills and the elderly and infirm would be left to die by the thousands.

Audience reaction

The sitcom was one of the most critically successful ITV comedy series of its day, and developed a strong following: the audience laughter was so loud and persistent that it apparently caused the show to overrun and the writers had to shorten the scripts to compensate. However, it was also regarded as cruel and irreverent, treating all its subjects with black humour and violent slapstick.  Rik Mayall said of the audience reaction he received "In the first series people were saying 'Gosh, isn't Rik Mayall good-looking?' but by the second they were saying 'Gosh, isn't Rik Mayall a good actor?' and that's all I ever really wanted."

Episode list

Newspaper columns

The Sunday Telegraph
Tying in with the original run of the stage show, British broadsheet newspaper The Sunday Telegraph ran a weekly opinion column penned by Alan B'Stard himself (in reality his creators, Marks and Gran). In it, Mr B'Stard writes as the founder of New Labour and effective ruler of the country, commenting on the week's events in politics, often referring to his frustrations with Tony and the rest of the cabinet. The column is written to suggest that the stage show is actually written by B'Stard himself as a method of communicating his achievements to 'the ordinaries'. One column mentioned how after Alan's divorce from his wife (a sub-plot of the original stage show), the ex-Mrs B'Stard "came over all dead".

New Statesman magazine

A bi-weekly opinion column first appeared in New Statesman magazine in 2010. As with the columns in The Sunday Telegraph and the Daily Mail, the articles are written as if by B'Stard himself as dictated to Marks and Gran. In these latest columns, B'Stard is now a Lord, (his final Sunday Telegraph piece seeing him leave the Commons and the country to become head of the World Bank) but still commentating on current events.

See also

 Yes Minister
 The Thick of It
 In the Loop
 List of fictional prime ministers of the United Kingdom
 James Anderton

References

External links
  Guide to Comedy.
 The New Statesman at the British Film Institute.
 .
 .
 .
 The New Statesman at phill.co.uk.
 Goldsborough Hall Alan's fictional Yorkshire residence.

1987 British television series debuts
1994 British television series endings
1980s British political television series
1980s British satirical television series
1980s British sitcoms
1990s British political television series
1990s British satirical television series
1990s British sitcoms
BAFTA winners (television series)
Cultural depictions of Margaret Thatcher
English-language television shows
ITV sitcoms
Television series by Fremantle (company)
Television series by ITV Studios
Television series by Yorkshire Television
Television shows set in London
British workplace comedy television series